Texas Thunder Soul 1968–1974 is a two-disc compilation album of recordings by the Kashmere Stage Band, released on Now-Again Records in 2006. The first disc contains studio recordings by the group, including energetic cover versions of "Theme from Shaft", "Super Bad", "Scorpio" and "Burning Spear". The second disc features unreleased live recordings and alternate takes, and includes a 12-minute video documentary about the group, Texas Jewels. The album includes a 40-page booklet filled with photos, interviews and ephemera.

Track listing
Disc one
 "Boss City"
 "Burning Spear"
 "Take Five"
 "Super Bad"
 "Keep Doing It"
 "Thunder Soul"
 "Do You Dig It, Man?"
 "Headwiggle"
 "Do Your Thing" **
 "Scorpio" **
 "Thank You" **
 "Al's Tune"
 "All Praises"
 "Shaft"
 "Kashmere"
 "$$ Kash Register $$"
 "Zero Point" – parts 1 & 2 (45 version) *
 "Getting It Out of My System"
Disc two
Live recordings (all previously unreleased):
 "Intro"
 "Zero Point"
 "All Praises" / "Zero Point" (Reprise)
 "Intro"
 "Do You Dig It, Man?"
 "Don't Mean a Thing"
 "Thank You"
 "Ain't No Sunshine"
 "Do You Dig It, Man?"
 "All Praises"
Alternate takes
 "Thank You" (45 version)
 "Zero Point" (LP version)
 "Do Your Thing" (instrumental)
 "Getting It Out of My System" *
Bonus documentary Texas Jewels

* previously unreleased
** previously unissued extended version

Credits

Musicians 
Ricky Adams –  Saxophone
Arthur Armstrong –  Saxophone
Frank Bell –  Drums
Johnny Brown –  Saxophone
Gerald Calhoun –  Bass
Andrei Carriere –  Guitar
Paul Chevalier –  Guitar
Rev. James Cleveland –  Trombone
Dorothy Compton –  Percussion
Lionel Cormier and the Sundown P –  Saxophone
Gerald Curvey –  Drums
Patricia Davis –  Lead
Ronnie Davis – Trumpet
Michael Dogan – Bass
Timothy Dunham – Saxophone
Lawrence Foster – Trombone
Samuel Frazier – Trumpet, Tambourine
Grady Gaines Douglas – Sax (Alto)
Roy Garcia – Guitar
Craig Green – Bass, Drums
Morris 'Sonny' Hall – Conga
Dwight Harris – Trombone
Ray Harris – Drums
James "Ham" Jackson – Saxophone
Leo Jackson – Trumpet
Michael "Mike Dee" Johnson – Trumpet
Audrey Jones – Trumpet
Jesse Jones, Jr. – Saxophone
Samuel Jones – Trombone
Sheila Jordan – Soprano (Vocal)
Hilton Joseph – Saxophone, Sax (Tenor)
Johnny Lewis – Drums
Henry Marks – Drums
Thaddeus McGowen – Saxophone
Bruce Middleton – Flute, Saxophone, Sax (Tenor)
George Miller – Saxophone, Tenor (Vocal)
Diane Moore – French Horn
Harold Morris – Saxophone
Cloyce Muckelroy – Trumpet
Alva Nelson – Organ, Saxophone, Fender Rhodes
Glennie Odoms – Saxophone
Larry Phillips – Saxophone
Shirley Ploucha – French Horn
Leon Polk – Trumpet
Johnny Reason – Guitar
Sherman Robertson – Guitar, Tambourine
Earl Spiller – Guitar
Byron Starling – Trombone
Roy Taylor – Saxophone
John C. Thomas – Trumpet
Wilmon Toran – Saxophone
Clyde Walker – Saxophone, Baritone (Vocal)
Jimmie "J.J." Walker – Trombone
Bruce White – Saxophone
Elray Wiseman – Trumpet
Byron Wooten – Trumpet
Henry Robinson – Drums
Naomi James – Piano
Linda Wiseman – Percussion
Katherine Lambert – Percussion
Elmer Glover – Bongos
Jackie Gray – Drums

Technical and art 
Eothen Alapatt – Transfers, Compilation Producer, Research, Annotation
Dave Cooley – Mastering, Restoration
Kelly Hibbert – Mastering, Restoration
Bill Holford – Engineer
Claude Robinson – Transfers
Matt Rowlands – Art Direction

References

External links
 Liner notes
 [ Allmusic]

2006 compilation albums
Funk compilation albums
2006 live albums
Live funk albums
Now-Again Records albums